Boleodorus is a genus of nematodes belonging to the family Tylenchidae.

The genus has almost cosmopolitan distribution.

Species:

Boleodorus abnormus 
Boleodorus acurvus 
Boleodorus acutus 
Boleodorus azadkashmirensis 
Boleodorus bambosus 
Boleodorus citri 
Boleodorus clavicaudatus 
Boleodorus constrictus 
Boleodorus cylindricus 
Boleodorus cynodoni 
Boleodorus filiformis 
Boleodorus flexuosus 
Boleodorus hyderi 
Boleodorus impar 
Boleodorus innuptus 
Boleodorus minustylus 
Boleodorus mirus 
Boleodorus modicus 
Boleodorus neosimilis 
Boleodorus pakistanensis 
Boleodorus punici 
Boleodorus rafiqi 
Boleodorus similis 
Boleodorus solomonensis 
Boleodorus spiralis 
Boleodorus tenuis 
Boleodorus teres 
Boleodorus thylactis
Boleodorus thylactus 
Boleodorus typicus 
Boleodorus volutus 
Boleodorus zaini

References

Nematodes